General elections were held in the British Virgin Islands on 14 April 1967. The election was the first general election after the passing of the new Constitution earlier in the same year, which introduced Ministerial Government into the British Virgin Islands for the first time. Elections under the prior Constitution introduced in 1950 to restore the Legislative Council had merely elected legislators.  It is probably fair to say that 1967 marked the introduction of true direct democratic rule in the British Virgin Islands.  But, notwithstanding the introduction of Ministerial Government, the resulting Legislative Council is still referred to as the 6th Legislative Council in deference to the five prior Councils elected under the 1950 Constitution.

Results

Prior to 1967 there had been no political parties in the British Virgin Islands. The election was therefore contested by three, newly created, political parties:
 The BVI United Party, led by Conrad Maduro
 The VI Democratic Party, led by Qwominer William Osborne
 The People's Own Party, led by Isaac Fonseca
The BVI United Party contested all seven available seats.  The other two parties only contested five seats each.  Lavity Stoutt had been elected each year since 1957.  Dr Osborne had been elected during the previous election in 1963.  Isaac Fonseca was the political veteran having been elected in every single election held in the Territory, commencing with the first in 1950.  

The result was a victory for the BVI United Party which won an overall majority of four seats. However, the party President, Conrad Maduro, did not win a seat and so was unable to become Chief Minister despite leading the party with the highest number of seats.  Accordingly, Lavity Stoutt was appointed as the first Chief Minister of the British Virgin Islands.  The VI Democratic Party won two seats, with the People's Own Party winning the remaining seat.  The most closely contested seat between the two parties with a plurality of seats was the Seventh District (Anegada and Virgin Gorda), which Robinson O'Neal won for the BVI United Party by a mere 13 votes over Reeial George for VI Democratic Party. If just seven voters in that district had voted the other way, the VI Democratic Party would have won, and Q.W. Osborne would have been the first Chief Minister.  As the results turned out, he had to settle for being the first leader of the opposition.  Similarly, if Conrad Maduro had secured a few more votes then he might have been the first Chief Minister.  However, as it happened the 1967 election effectively launched a long and successful career for Lavity Stoutt, who would end up being elected Chief Minister five times.

Voter turnout was a relatively high 72.3% with only 5 spoiled ballots in the entire country. The Supervisor of Elections was initially D.K.H. McIntyre, but he had to retire on grounds of ill-health and was replaced by Lionel W. Barker on 27 February 1967.

By constituency
Results for the individual electoral districts were as follow:

First Electoral District

Second Electoral District

Third Electoral District

Fourth Electoral District

Fifth Electoral District

Sixth Electoral District

Seventh Electoral District

Ministerial appointments
Lavity Stoutt was appointed as first Chief Minister and first Minister for Education.  Q.W. Osborne was appointed as the First Leader of the Opposition.  Ivan Dawson, despite not being a member of the BVI United Party, was appointed first Minister for National Resources and Public Health.

Future Chief Minister, Cyril Romney, was also appointed as the first Native BVIslander to act as Financial Secretary after the election.

References

Elections in the British Virgin Islands
British Virgin Islands
General election
April 1967 events in North America
British Virgin